Victoria Bryant State Park is a 502-acre (2.03 km2) Georgia state park located near Franklin Springs. Nestled in the rolling hills of Georgia's Piedmont plateau, this park offers facilities ranging from picnic sites and a swimming pool to an 18-hole golf course. The North Fork of the Broad River flows through the park, adding several water hazards to the course.  The park also offers a short nature trail plus a long perimeter trail that takes hikers through hardwood forests.  In addition, the park is home to many species of birds, plants, and reptiles.

Facilities
35 Tent/Trailer/RV sites
Pioneer camping
Golf course
3 playgrounds
Swimming pool
5 Picnic shelters
Nature Center
2 Fishing ponds

Annual events
Junior-Senior Catfish Rodeo (Memorial Day weekend)
Father-Son Golf Tournament
Civil War Enactment (June)

History
The site was originally owned by Paul Bryant, who donated the land in the early 1950s as a state park, with the condition it be named after his late mother, Victoria Bryant.

References

External links
Victoria Bryant State Park

State parks of Georgia (U.S. state)
IUCN Category V
Protected areas of Franklin County, Georgia